Claude Lastennet (born January 19, 1971) is a French serial killer who was convicted of murdering five elderly women between August 1993 and January 1994.

Lastennet was convicted of murdering the following 5 victims:

Lastennet was arrested on January 12, 1994, and admitted his guilt to police. He was sentenced to life imprisonment without the possibility of parole for 18 years.

See also
 List of French serial killers

References 

1971 births
French people convicted of murder
French prisoners sentenced to life imprisonment
French serial killers
Living people
Male serial killers
People convicted of murder by France
Prisoners sentenced to life imprisonment by France